The 1924–25 season was the 25th season of competitive football in Belgium. Beerschot AC won their third Division I title. At the end of the season, RC de Bruxelles, FC Malinois and White Star AC were relegated to the Promotion, while RC de Malines, CS Verviétois and R Tilleur FC were promoted.

National team

* Belgium score given first

Key
 H = Home match
 A = Away match
 N = On neutral ground
 F = Friendly
 o.g. = own goal

Honours

Final league tables

Division I

Promotion

Promotion A

Promotion B

External links
RSSSF archive - Final tables 1895-2002
Belgian clubs history